Palaemnema baltodanoi is a species of damselfly in the family Platystictidae. It is endemic to Costa Rica.  Its natural habitats are subtropical or tropical moist lowland forests and rivers. It is threatened by habitat loss.

Sources

Insects of Central America
Platystictidae
Insects described in 1989
Taxonomy articles created by Polbot